Yavor Borisov Vandev (born 29 May 1983) is a Bulgarian footballer, currently playing for Svoboda Peshtera as a striker.

Career
Born in Sliven, Vandev started to play football at local club Sliven 2000. He made his debut for the first team in 2001, in the Bulgarian amateur division. After a series of good displays, Vandev caught the eye of Lokomotiv Plovdiv scouts and he signed for "Loko" in the early 2003. The forward made his official debut in the Bulgarian first division on 13 March 2004 in a match against Chernomorets Burgas as a 62nd-minute substitute. In the same year Vandev won the Bulgarian Championship title with Lokomotiv. He played for the team from Plovdiv for five seasons.

In August 2008 Yavor returned to his home team of Sliven 2000 for a fee of 100,000 €. He began his second period in Sliven very well and scored 5 goals in 4 matches. After periods with Brestnik, Minyor Pernik, Bdin and Haskovo, Vandev moved away from Bulgaria to play for Club Valencia, a team competing in the Maldivian Dhiraagu Dhivehi League.

Honours
 Champion of Bulgaria 2004 (with PFC Lokomotiv Plovdiv)
 Bulgarian Supercup 2004 (with PFC Lokomotiv Plovdiv)

References

External links
Vandev Statistics with SV Neubäu at fupa.net

1983 births
Association football forwards
First Professional Football League (Bulgaria) players
Bulgarian expatriate footballers
Bulgarian footballers
Club Valencia players
FC Haskovo players
Living people
OFC Sliven 2000 players
PFC Kaliakra Kavarna players
PFC Lokomotiv Plovdiv players
PFC Minyor Pernik players
Sportspeople from Sliven